Equiano is a crater on Mercury. It has a diameter of 102 kilometers. Its name was adopted by the International Astronomical Union in 1976. Equiano is named for the abolitionist writer Olaudah Equiano, who lived from 1750 to 1797.

Equiano has patches of bright material near its central peak, and these may be hollows.

To the northeast of Equiano is Mofolo crater, and to the northwest is Neumann crater.

References

Impact craters on Mercury